Acacia spania, also known as western rosewood, is a tree belonging to the genus Acacia and the subgenus Juliflorae that is endemic to north eastern Australia.

Description
The glabrous and angular branchlets have a light brown colour and are usually scurfy. Like most species of Acacia it has phyllodes rather than true leaves. The glabrous and evergreen phyllodes have a narrowly elliptic to elliptic shape and are flat and straight to slightly curved. The grey green to blue-green are quite stiff phyllodes and have three to five main longitudinal nerves.

Distribution
It is found in a small area of inland east-central Queensland mostly from a couple of localities around Emerald where it is situated in red soils often present as dense stands as a part of woodland communities where it is often associated with species of Eucalyptus and other species of Acacia.

See also
List of Acacia species

References

spania
Flora of Queensland
Plants described in 1978
Taxa named by Leslie Pedley